Skokie School District may refer to:
 Skokie School District 68
Skokie School District 73½

See also:
 Skokie/Morton Grove School District 69
 Evanston/Skokie School District 65